Kimberly Crandall is an American actress known for her roles in Beckinfield and Fresh Off the Boat.  Kimberly is also an acting coach.

Filmography

Film

Television

References 

Living people
American actresses
Year of birth missing (living people)
21st-century American women